Dancing on Ice is a German reality TV show. The show features celebrities paired with professionals from the world of figure skating. The show is based on the British show, Dancing on Ice. The show has a schedule similar to the reality TV show Let's Dance. The show started airing on October 9, 2006 on RTL.

Series overview
Four series have been broadcast to date, as summarised below.

Presenters and judges
Key
 Presenter
 Judge

Professionals

 Winner
 Runner-up
 Third place
 First eliminated
 Withdrew
 Participating

Main series results

Series 1 (2006)

Series 2 (2006)

Series 3 (2007-08)

Series 4 (2019)

Series 5 (2019)

References

External links
Official website

German music television series
German reality television series
2006 German television series debuts
2010s German television series
RTL (German TV channel) original programming
ProSieben original programming
Sat.1 original programming
German-language television shows
German television series based on British television series
Germany